Arndt Ludwig "Art" Jorgens (May 18, 1905 – March 1, 1980) was a catcher in Major League Baseball who played from  through   for the New York Yankees.

Biography
Jorgens was born in Modum, Buskerud County, Norway. His family moved to the United States, where he attended Lane Tech High School in Chicago, Illinois. His brother Orville Jorgens also played in the majors. 

Art Jorgens batted and threw right-handed.  He was slender for a catcher, at 5' 9" 160-lb.

Jorgens was purchased by the New York Yankees from Oklahoma City (Western) on August 24, 1928. His debut game with the New York Yankees was on April 26, 1929. Jorgens played his entire major league career with the Yankees serving as a backup catcher for Bill Dickey in eleven consecutive seasons. In 1934, he posted career-highs in hits (38), runs batted in (20) and games (58). He had a career-high .270 batting average in 1931. Jorgens was a career .238 hitter with four home runs and 89 RBI in 307 games. He has been one of only three Norwegian-born players to reach the major leagues. His final games with the New York Yankees was on August 2, 1939.

Jorgens died in Wilmette, Illinois, at age of 74. He is buried in Memorial Park Cemetery, Skokie, Illinois.

Notable achievements
 Jorgens has the dubious distinction of having played on teams that won five pennants and five world championships (the New York Yankees in 1932, 1936, 1937, 1938 and 1939), yet never making a single appearance in a World Series game. Over that period, the team's star catcher, (future Hall of Famer) Bill Dickey, played every inning of each World Series game.

See also
List of Major League Baseball players who spent their entire career with one franchise

References

External links

Art Jorgens New York Yankees Baseball card
Jorgens stats at Baseball Almanac

1905 births
1980 deaths
People from Modum
Norwegian emigrants to the United States
New York Yankees players
Major League Baseball catchers
Major League Baseball players from Norway
Rock Island Islanders players